Anand Raaj Anand is an Indian composer, lyricist and playback singer in the Hindi film industry. He was nominated for the Best Music Director Filmfare Award for Kaante (2003).

Early life
Anand Raj was born on  8 November 1961 in Delhi in a family of Jewellers. In 1995, he left his family business and went to Mumbai to pursue musical career.

Career
In 1995, his first private album came "Babu Tiptop" in Time music. "Jhanjharia aise chhanak gayi", of this album later was used in the film Krishna by Time Audio (also known as Time Magnetics). He started his work in 1996 when he wrote, composed and sang the songs for the film Masoom in 1996 where the song Chhota Bachcha Jaan Ke along with Kale Libaas Mein and Tukur Tukur Dekhte Ho Kya. Since then, he has been the music director and composer of over 90 films, the lyricist of over 40 soundtracks, and he did playback singing for over 45 films.

Some of his most famous work includes Masoom, Pardesi Babu, Hadh Kar Di Aapne, Bichhoo, Jis Desh Mein Ganga Rehta Hai, Kaante, Kismat, Musafir, Welcome, Shootout at Lokhandwala, Double Dhamaal, Singh Saab The Great and recently released Shootout at Wadala''.
He specializes in creating legendary item song like Ishq Samundar, Mere Yaar, Unke Nashe Mein, Hoth Rasiley, Billo Rani, Jalebi Bai, Laila and many others.

He has also made the Anthem for Commonwealth Games 2010 and performed in the opening ceremony.

Apart from giving hit music in films, he has composed for some Private Indian Pop Albums. Some of them are Kamaal Khan's "Suno To Deewana Dil", Suneeta Rao's "Ab Ke Baras", Vibha Sharma's "Mehandi", and Hans Raj Hans's "Chorni" and "Sab Ton Sohni".

Discography

Films

Albums

References

External links
 
 Singer files case against Anand Raaj Anand
 Lion of Punjab Film/Music Release Date

Living people
Indian film score composers
Indian male playback singers
Indian male film score composers
1961 births